An argus, or argus pheasant, is a member of a clade in the tribe Pavonini of the family Phasianidae, containing two species of bird  that are closely related to peafowl.

Description
It has hundreds or thousands of tiny white spots on its plumage pattern, and thus its naming might have been in reference to the mythical hundred-eyed giant, Argus Panoptes.

Taxonomy
Two genera of birds are considered arguses: Rheinardia and Argusianus. Within these genera there are a total of three recognized species. Argusianus has also been credited with a mysterious second species that is sometimes thought to have gone extinct, but this is most likely based on a simple genetic aberration in the established species. Both genera are thought to be sister taxa to one another, and are otherwise most closely related to the peafowl (genera Pavo and Afropavo), and slightly more distantly to the genus Tropicoperdix.

Genus and distribution
Genus Argusianus Rafinesque, 1815
Great argus (Argusianus argus (Linnaeus, 1766)) 
Genus Rheinardia Maingonnat, 1882
Vietnamese crested argus (Rheinardia ocellata (Elliot, 1871))
Malayan crested argus (Rheinardia nigrescens (Rothschild, 1902))

References 

Pheasants
Pavonini
Bird common names